Jean Ikellé-Matiba (April 26, 1936–1984) was a Cameroonian writer born in the Sanaga-Maritime division, Littoral Province, Cameroon. He studied in Paris and worked in France and Germany.

Notable works 
Cette Afrique là !(1963): written in French it is a political literature which examines Cameroons colonial periods.
Adler und Lilie in Kamerun : Lebensbericht eines Afrikaners (1966) : written in German, it is the biography of an African who lived and worked under German and French colonial administration

References

Cameroonian male writers
People from Littoral Region (Cameroon)
1936 births
1984 deaths
20th-century Cameroonian writers
Cameroonian expatriates in France
Cameroonian expatriates in Germany
20th-century male writers